"I've Got the Next Dance" is a song by Deniece Williams issued as a single in April 1979 on ARC/Columbia Records. The song reached No. 1 on the Billboard Dance Club Play chart and No. 26 on the Billboard Hot Soul Songs chart.

Overview
"I've Got the Next Dance" was composed by Cheyenne Fowler, Keg Johnson and June Deniece Williams. although there were three other non-credited composers. The song was also produced by David Foster and came off Williams' 1979 album When Love Comes Calling.

Critical reception
Connie Johnson of the Los Angeles Times found that "Williams rocks assertively in an arrangement that would have overwhelmed a lesser singer." Andy Kellman of Allmusic called I've Got the Next Dance "an effervescent slice of galloping disco-pop".

References

1979 singles
Columbia Records singles
Deniece Williams songs
Disco songs
1979 songs
Songs written by Deniece Williams
Song recordings produced by David Foster
Songs about dancing